Craig Sugden (born 7 March 1974) is a South African cricketer. He played in 56 first-class and 59 List A matches from 1993 to 2004.

References

External links
 

1974 births
Living people
South African cricketers
Border cricketers
KwaZulu-Natal cricketers
Cricketers from Durban